Kade Wolhuter (born ) is a South African rugby union player for the  in Super Rugby. His regular position is fly-half.

Wolhuter was named in the  squad for the Super Rugby Unlocked competition.

References

South African rugby union players
Living people
2001 births
Rugby union fly-halves
Stormers players
Western Province (rugby union) players
Rugby union players from Cape Town